Liedertafel may refer to the following choral societies:
Adelaide Liedertafel
Berliner Liedertafel
Tanunda Liedertafel